Boguédia is a town in west-central Ivory Coast. It is a sub-prefecture of Issia Department in Haut-Sassandra Region, Sassandra-Marahoué District.

Boguédia was a commune until March 2012, when it became one of 1126 communes nationwide that were abolished.

In 2014, the population of the sub-prefecture of Boguédia was 20,943.

Villages
The 18 villages of the sub-prefecture of Boguédia and their population in 2014 are:

Notes

Sub-prefectures of Haut-Sassandra
Former communes of Ivory Coast